

Class of 2006 

|-
| colspan="7" style="padding-left:10px;" | Overall Recruiting Rankings:     Scout – 17     Rivals – 21       ESPN –
|}

Roster

Schedule

|-
!colspan=6 style=|Regular Season
|-

|-
!colspan=6 style=|Pac-10 Tournament

|-
!colspan=6 style=|NCAA Tournament

References

Usc Trojans
USC Trojans men's basketball seasons
USC
USC Trojans
USC Trojans